Gisborne is a town in the Macedon Ranges, located about  north-west of Melbourne, Victoria, Australia. It is the largest town in the Macedon Ranges Shire, with a population of 14,432 as of June 2021 in the Gisborne district region.

Gisborne is known for its country homesteads, tree-lined streets, restaurants and cafes. The town has become a popular 'tree change' destination for Melbourne residents seeking large leafy blocks and a quiet lifestyle within easy commuting distance from the city. As such, the town has grown substantially over the past 5–10 years, with an increase of almost 2,600 residents since 2011, although planning controls have been implemented to protect the character and "outstanding natural beauty" of the region.

History

The original inhabitants of Gisborne were the Dja Dja Wurrung and Wurundjeri Aboriginal people. Aboriginal people have lived in the Macedon Ranges area for at least 26,000 years. The Wurundjeri, Dja Dja Wurrrung and Taungurung communities are still active.

The Gisborne town site was first settled by Europeans on 24 March 1837 by George Hamilton (Australian police officer). The area further south of Gisborne had been settled earlier by John Aitken, who squatted on the land having shipped his merino sheep from Tasmania.

In 1840, Henry Fyshe Gisborne, Commissioner of Crown Lands for the Port Phillip District, set up an outpost for his Border Police troopers to assist colonialists with the suppression of Aboriginal resistance.

A hotel named the Bush Inn was built near the barracks in the same year. Gisborne Post Office opened on 22 March 1850, and the Bush Inn was renamed the Gisborne Hotel ten days later, in honour of Henry Fyshe Gisborne.

Today
Gisborne is the largest township in the Macedon Ranges and the closest to Melbourne's city centre, which can be accessed easily via a 45-minute drive along the Calder Freeway or a 50 minute train ride on the Bendigo Line. The population in June 2018 was 13,963 having grown on average 2.93% year-on-year for the five years preceding 2018.

The town centre has many cafes and wine bars, as well a theatre, restaurants and galleries, monthly farmers' market, an organic butcher and four supermarkets (FoodWorks, IGA (supermarkets), Coles Supermarkets and Aldi) stocking local produce, as well as organic, vegan and gluten-free foods. Gisborne has a full-time police station in conjunction with the CFA station, State Emergency Service and medical-ambulance facilities.

Sporting facilities cater for AFL football, cricket, soccer, tennis, netball gymnastics, and lawn bowls as well as a heated indoor pool. The popular golf course is located within the township and regularly features as one of the top 100 public access courses in Australia. The Gisborne Soccer Club captain is ex-Socceroo and Melbourne Victory captain Carl Valeri.

A number of media reports have made reference to the influx of young professionals, artists and 'hipsters' to the region, drawn by the region's natural beauty, proximity to Melbourne and access to city-style cafes and restaurants. The large numbers of new residents is making the local population growth rate among the fastest in regional Victoria. Locals, worried about the environmental and cultural impacts of this growing popularity, successfully campaigned for new planning controls to protect the character of the region.

Population
In the 2016 census, Gisborne had a population count of 9,822 people. At the time, 82.1% of the town's residents were born in Australia, with the most common foreign countries of birth being England (4.0%) and New Zealand (1.3%). The most common responses for religion were "No Religion" (35.3%), Catholic (28.3%) and Anglican (13.0%).

Public Transport
The town's railway station is on the Bendigo Line, serviced by V/Line. Trains take 20 minutes between Gisborne and Sunbury, where customers can connect directly to Metro services; otherwise, V/Line can take customers directly into Melbourne's CBD, terminating at Southern Cross Station. When the railway line was being built, it was too difficult to get the trains down into Gisborne's township due to terrain, so instead the Gisborne railway station was built just outside the township, forming the new suburb of New Gisborne.

The town has its own dedicated bus service called GisBus, which runs looped shuttle services around the township, as well as on-demand pick-up and drop-off services connecting townsfolk to the railway station, as part of PTV.

Media
The town receives all of Melbourne's metropolitan digital television channels, including Channel 31. The town also receives television from Mount Alexander but signals from Melbourne are much stronger. The town is largely serviced by major publication newspapers such as The Age, but Gisborne also receives free weekly regional news from the Midland Express, as well as a monthly Gisborne-dedicated publication, the GREAT Gisborne Gazette.

Gisborne features as a backdrop for several films and television series, including Nightmares & Dreamscapes: From the Stories of Stephen King. In 2022, Gisborne South was chosen as the filming location for the reality television series The Block.

Education
The town has two public primary schools and one public secondary school, Gisborne Secondary College. The Gisborne Montessori School and Candlebark (alternative school) provide additional options. A third public primary school, Willowbank Primary School, is set to open in 2022 in Gisborne South.

Sister cities
  Gisborne, New Zealand

Image gallery

See also
 Gisborne railway station, Victoria
 New Gisborne
 Sunbury, Victoria
 Gisborne South
 Gisborne Secondary College
 Bullengarook

References

External links

 A Brief History of Gisborne and Mount Macedon Districts
 Gisborne Tourism Guide
 Gisborne Region Events and Tourism
 Gisborne CFA

Towns in Victoria (Australia)
Shire of Macedon Ranges